Naarda ascensalis is a species of moth in the family Noctuidae first described by Swinhoe.

References

Herminiinae